Paul Borg Olivier OSI (born 1 September 1969) is a Maltese politician, former mayor of the Maltese capital city Valletta and Secretary-General of the Nationalist Party.

Borg Olivier read law and was conferred with a Doctorate in Law from the University of Malta in 1995. He was admitted to the Maltese Bar of Advocates in 1996 and first served a Senior Associate with Fenech and Fenech Advocates (1996–2000), later setting up his private practice.

Borg Olivier stood as a Nationalist Party candidate (a party founded on Christian Democratic principles and member of the European Peoples Party) for National and Local Elections in the First Electoral District including Valletta in 1996, 1998, 2003 and 2008. He was elected Valletta Deputy Mayor (1996–99) and Mayor for three consecutive terms (1999–2008).

He was elected Secretary-General of the Nationalist Party on June 27, 2008 under the party leadership of Lawrence Gonzi, succeeding Joe Saliba shortly after the Nationalist Party was returned to government in 2008 for a third consecutive term.

Paul Borg Olivier’s five year term of office came to an end in June 2013 and was succeeded by Chris Said, former Minister of Justice in the Lawrence Gonzi Government (2008–2013).

Paul Borg Olivier is the nephew of former Maltese Prime Minister Giorgio Borg Olivier and grandson of Paolo Borg Olivier, a former Nationalist Party Minister.

Following the return to his legal profession, Paul Borg Olivier piloted and headed the legal team winning one of Malta's leading recent cases before the Constitutional Court. The case related to the fundamental human rights and freedoms in electoral processes based on free and fair elections as listed in the European Convention on Human Rights. As a result of this case National Parliament was recomposed in the number of Members of parliament to better reflect the vote of the electors in the 2013 General Elections.

Dr Borg Olivier wrote the introduction to Frans Sammut's Bonaparte à Malte.

Paul Borg Olivier took up photography in 2013. In 2015 he was awarded, from amongst 900 world entries, First Prize in the I Shot it Competition, partnered with Leica. He shoots with Leica M cameras and lenses and his main subjects are Valletta, Street Photography and Documentary Photography. In 2014, Paul Borg Olivier was interviewed on the Leica Camera Blog.

Paul Borg Olivier is President of the Società Dante Alighieri, Comitato di Malta. 

He is married to Gloria and they have one daughter, Maria Pia, born in 2005.

Paul Borg Olivier is currently a practicing lawyer.

Honours 
 :
Commander (Encomienda) in the Order of Civil Merit, Orden del Mérito Civil), 2008

 :
Order pro merito melitensi, Medaglia pro Merito Melitensi (Argento), 2008

 : 

Cavaliere dell'Ordine della Stella d'Italia, 2021.

References

Living people
Mayors of places in Malta
Nationalist Party (Malta) politicians
People from Valletta
1969 births
20th-century Maltese politicians
21st-century Maltese politicians